"YOLO" is the second single by Japanese rock band Band-Maid. Released in Japan on November 16, 2016, by Crown Stones, it is the band's first single on a major record label. The title track is featured as the theme song of the video game Valiant Knights.

Composition
In 2019, as Band-Maiko, they released an alternate version of "YOLO" (retitled "YOLOSIOSU"), with traditional Japanese instruments  and lyrics rewritten in the Kyoto dialect.

Background and release
The single was released in two versions: a standard edition, and a limited edition, which contains the CD and a music sheet for the song "YOLO", enclosed in a sleeve. Both editions of the single feature the b-sides "Unfair Game" and "Matchless Gum", along with an instrumental version of the title track. The artworks were designed with the motif of the headbands that Saiki (Limited Edition) and Miku Kobato (Regular Edition) wear usually on the stage.

Critical reception
Trent Cannon of Rice Digital called the title track "High energy and forceful" and that it "...features an incredible guitar riff that really highlights Tono’s skills as well as the harmonies between Atsumi and Kobato’s voices."

Music video
The music video for the title track was released on October 1, 2016.

Live performances
"YOLO" was debuted at the "Brand New Maid Release Tour Final" show at Tsutaya O-West on October 1, 2016. "Matchless Gum" was debuted at the "Brand New Maid Release Tour Final additional service" at Shimokitazawa Garden on October 23, 2016. "Unfair Game" was debuted at the "YOLO Release Out-store mini-service" at Club Vijon on December 7, 2016.

To promote the release of the single, the band performed "YOLO" on December 3, 2016, at Tower Records, Shibuya as a part of the "Tower Records Maid 'YOLO' Release Memorial ~ Mini Service ~ event". The band also played "YOLO" and "Unfair Game" at the "1st Full Album" Just Bring It "Pre-Release One-man ~ New Year's First Serving Start ~" at Akasaka Blitz in Tokyo. Footage of "YOLO" taken from this concert was released in a bonus DVD for the limited edition of their third single "Daydreaming/Choose Me".

Track listing

Credits and personnel 
Band-Maid members
 Misa – bass
 Miku Kobato – vocals, guitar
 Saiki Atsumi – vocals
 Akane Hirose – drums
 Kanami Tōno – guitar

Recording and management
 Recorded at Nasoundra Palace Studio
 Recording Engineer: Masyoshi Yamamoto
 Mixed at Mix Forest
 Mix Engineer: Masahiko Fukui
 Mastered by Shigeo "MT" Miyamoto (form The Master)
 Art Direction: Masashi Nakazato (Number NC)
 Photograph: Riu Nakamura
 Stylist: Mayako Shigeta

Credits adapted from "YOLO" single liner notes.

Charts

Release history

References

External links 
 Discography – Band-Maid official website

2016 singles
Band-Maid songs
Japanese-language songs